Ron Bochar is an American film sound engineer. On January 24, 2012, he was nominated for an Academy Award for the movie Moneyball.

References

External links

Year of birth missing (living people)
Living people
American audio engineers
Place of birth missing (living people)
21st-century American people